Habichtswald is a municipality in the district of Kassel, in Hesse, Germany. It is located 12 kilometers west of Kassel.

References

Kassel (district)